4 is the fifth album by the Swedish psychedelic rock group Dungen.

It was released as a CD on 24 September 2008 by Subliminal Sounds (Sweden). The album was released in the US on Kemado Records on 30 September 2008.

Track listing

Personnel
 Gustav Ejstes – flute, organ, percussion, piano, strings, vocals, producer, engineer
 Reine Fiske – bass guitar, guitar, percussion
 Mattias Gustafsson – bass guitar on 3, 8 and 9
 Carl-Michael Herlöfsson – mastering
 Johan Holmegard – percussion, drums
 Anna Järvinen – backing vocals on 5 and 8
 Stefan Kéry – executive producer and cover design
 Pierre Lindsjöö – assistant engineer
 Karl Max – portraits
 Fredrik Swahn – bass guitar on 6

References

2008 albums
Dungen albums